1J or 1-J may refer to:

AH-1J, a model of Bell AH-1 SuperCobra
ISS 1J, designation for STS-124

See also
Joule
J1 (disambiguation)